The 2015 Butler Bulldogs football team represented Butler University in the 2015 NCAA Division I FCS football season. They were led by tenth-year head coach Jeff Voris and played their home games at the Butler Bowl. They were a member of the Pioneer Football League. They finished the season 6–5, 4–4 in PFL play to finish in a three way tie for fourth place.

Schedule

Source: Schedule

Game summaries

at Indiana State

Franklin

at Taylor

Campbell

at Morehead State

Davidson

at Dayton

at Marist

Valparaiso

Drake

at San Diego

References

Butler
Butler Bulldogs football seasons
Butler Bulldogs football